The Tucker Prize for outstanding theses in the area of optimization is sponsored by the Mathematical Optimization Society (MOS). Up to three finalists are presented at each (triennial) International Symposium of the MOS. The winner will receive an award of $1000 and a certificate. The Albert W. Tucker Prize was established by the Society in 1985, and was first awarded at the Thirteenth International Symposium on Mathematical Programming in 1988.

Winners and finalists
 1988: 
 Andrew V. Goldberg for "Efficient graph algorithms for sequential and parallel computers".
 1991: 
 Michel Goemans for "Analysis of Linear Programming Relaxations for a Class of Connectivity Problems".
 Other Finalists: Leslie Hall and Mark Hartmann
 1994:
 David P. Williamson for "On the Design of Approximation Algorithms for a Class of Graph Problems".
 Other Finalists: Dick Den Hertog and Jiming Liu
 1997:
 David Karger for "Random Sampling in Graph Optimization Problems".
 Other Finalists: Jim Geelen and Luis Nunes Vicente
 2000:
 Bertrand Guenin for his PhD thesis.
 Other Finalists: Kamal Jain and Fabian Chudak
 2003:
 Tim Roughgarden for "Selfish Routing".
 Other Finalists: Pablo Parrilo and Jiming Peng
 2006:
 Uday V. Shanbhag for "Decomposition and Sampling Methods for Stochastic Equilibrium Problems".
 Other Finalists: José Rafael Correa and Dion Gijswijt
 2009:
 Mohit Singh for "Iterative Methods in Combinatorial Optimization".
 Other Finalists: Tobias Achterberg and Jiawang Nie
 2012:
 Oliver Friedmann for "Exponential Lower Bounds for Solving Infinitary Payoff Games and Linear Programs".
 Other Finalists: Amitabh Basu and Guanghui Lan
 2015:
 Daniel Dadush for "Integer Programming, Lattice Algorithms, and Deterministic Volume Computation".
 Other Finalists: Dmitriy Drusvyatskiy and Marika Karbstein

See also 
 List of computer science awards

References

External links
 Official web page (MOS)

Computer science awards
Triennial events